is a Japanese goalball player who won a gold medal at the 2012 Summer Paralympics. She scored the game-winning goal in the final against China.

She was diagnosed with macular degeneration in her right eye when she was 14 years old. When she was 20, a visual condition also developed in her left eye, causing impairment. She began playing goalball in 2006, at age 23.

References 

Paralympic gold medalists for Japan
Goalball players at the 2008 Summer Paralympics
Goalball players at the 2012 Summer Paralympics
Goalball players at the 2016 Summer Paralympics
Sportspeople from Fukuoka Prefecture
People from Yame, Fukuoka
1983 births
Living people
Medalists at the 2012 Summer Paralympics
Paralympic goalball players of Japan
Female goalball players
Paralympic medalists in goalball
21st-century Japanese women